Mikhail Vasilyevich Ostrogradsky (transcribed also Ostrogradskiy, Ostrogradskiĭ) (24 September 1801 – 1 January 1862) was a Russian mathematician, mechanician and physicist of Ukrainian Cossack ancestry. Ostrogradsky was a student of Timofei Osipovsky and is considered to be a disciple of Leonhard Euler, who was known as one of the leading mathematicians of Imperial Russia.

Life 
Ostrogradsky was born on 24 September 1801 in the village of Pashennaya (at the time in the Poltava Governorate, Russian Empire, today in Kremenchuk Raion, Poltava Oblast, Ukraine). From 1816 to 1820, he studied under Timofei Osipovsky (1765–1832) and graduated from the Imperial University of Kharkov. When Osipovsky was suspended on religious grounds in 1820, Ostrogradsky refused to be examined and he never received his Ph.D. degree. From 1822 to 1826, he studied at the Sorbonne and at the Collège de France in Paris, France. In 1828, he returned to the Russian Empire and settled in Saint Petersburg, where he was elected a member of the Academy of Sciences. He also became a professor of the Main military engineering School of the Russian Empire.

Ostrogradsky died in Poltava in 1862, aged 60. The Kremenchuk Mykhailo Ostrohradskyi National University in Kremenchuk, Poltava oblast, as well as Ostrogradsky street in Poltava, are named after him.

Work 

He worked mainly in the mathematical fields of calculus of variations, integration of algebraic functions, number theory, algebra, geometry, probability theory and in the fields of applied mathematics, mathematical physics and classical mechanics. In the latter, his key contributions are in the motion of an elastic body and the development of methods for integration of the equations of dynamics and fluid power, following up on the works of Euler, Joseph Louis Lagrange, Siméon Denis Poisson and Augustin Louis Cauchy.

In Russia, his work in these fields was continued by Nikolay Dmitrievich Brashman (1796–1866), August Yulevich Davidov (1823–1885) and especially by Nikolai Yegorovich Zhukovsky (1847–1921).

Ostrogradsky did not appreciate the work on non-Euclidean geometry of Nikolai Lobachevsky from 1823, and he rejected it, when it was submitted for publication in the Saint Petersburg Academy of Sciences.

Ostrogradsky was a teacher of the children of Emperor Nicholas I.

Divergence theorem
In 1826, Ostrogradsky gave the first general proof of the divergence theorem, which was discovered by Lagrange in 1762.  This theorem may be expressed using Ostrogradsky's equation:
 ;
where P, Q, and R are differentiable functions of x, y, and z defined on the compact region V bounded by a smooth closed surface Σ; λ, μ, and ν are the angles that the outward normal to Σ makes with the positive x, y, and z axes respectively; and dΣ is the surface area element on Σ.

Ostrogradsky's integration method
His method for integrating rational functions is well known. First, we separate the rational part of the integral of a fractional rational function, the sum of the rational part (algebraic fraction) and the transcendental part (with the logarithm and the arctangent). Second, we determine the rational part without integrating it, and we assign a given integral in Ostrogradsky's form:

Fourth, the denominator of the remaining integral  can be calculated from the equation .

When we differentiate both sides of the equation above we will get 

where 
It can be shown that  is polynomial

See also

Gauss-Ostrogradsky theorem
Green's theorem
Ostrogradsky instability

Notes

References
.
.

External links

1801 births
1862 deaths
People from Poltava Oblast
People from Kobelyaksky Uyezd
Ukrainian mathematicians
Mathematicians from the Russian Empire
19th-century mathematicians from the Russian Empire
Physicists from the Russian Empire
National University of Kharkiv alumni
University of Paris alumni
Members of the French Academy of Sciences
Full members of the Saint Petersburg Academy of Sciences
Academic staff of Military Engineering-Technical University
Privy Councillor (Russian Empire)